Hwagok Station is a station on Seoul Subway Line 5 in Gangseo-gu, Seoul.

Station layout

References

Railway stations opened in 1996
Seoul Metropolitan Subway stations
Metro stations in Gangseo District, Seoul
1996 establishments in South Korea
20th-century architecture in South Korea